Jason Anderson may refer to:

 Jason Anderson (American football) (born 1980), American football player
 Jason Anderson (baseball) (born 1979), Major League Baseball player
 Jason Anderson (cricketer) (born 1979), Bermudian cricketer
 Jason D. Anderson, American video game designer
 Jason Anderson (wrestler) (born 1965), Canadian wrestler
 Jason Anderson (motorcyclist) (born 1993), American professional motocross racer
 Jason Anderson (film critic), see Toronto Film Critics Association
 Jason C. Anderson (1975–2010), American oil rigger died in the Deepwater Horizon explosion